Wednesfield is a town and historic village in the City of Wolverhampton, West Midlands, England, It is  east-northeast of Wolverhampton city centre and about  from Birmingham and is part of the West Midlands conurbation. It was historically within the county of Staffordshire.

Its name comes from the Old English Wōdnesfeld meaning Woden's Field, open land belonging to, or holy to, the high god of the Germanic Pantheon.

It is reported by the English Dialectal Society in the publication "A Glossary of dialectal place-nomenclature" available on-line in the Internet Archive of The University of Toronto Library, that the place name "Wednesfield" is pronounced by the local populace as "Wencefield".

Local areas include Ashmore Park and Wood End.  There is also a formal garden at Wednesfield Park.

Geography
Wednesfield lies at  (52.5998°, −2.0827°), and is located to the northeast of Wolverhampton city centre on the northern fringe of the West Midlands conurbation.  It was historically part of the county of Staffordshire, and since 1974 has been part of the West Midlands metropolitan county.

The south of the town lies over coal measures whilst the town centre has dolerite deposits and the area to the north lies over mudstone and sandstone. The town lies on generally flat land between 130m and 140m above sea level, rising to around 170m in the north.

There are no navigable rivers within the town, although the original course of the River Tame crossed the south-east of the town.

Governance
Following the Poor Law Amendment Act 1834, Wednesfield formed part of the Wolverhampton Poor Law Union, an inter-parish unit established to provide social security.  This replaced an earlier arrangement where the Parish had operated a workhouse on Old Heath Road since 1723. In 1863 the Wednesfield Local Board of Health was established. With reference to the Local Government Act 1858, it was a regulatory body responsible for standards of hygiene and sanitation in the township, and replaced an earlier Sanitary Committee that was established in 1856.  The Local Board was only in existence for three years before being split into two, one for Wednesfield itself, and one for Wednesfield Heath.

Following the Local Government Act 1894, the rump of the parish (minus Wednesfield Heath and part of what became Short Heath Urban District) became an urban district within the administrative county of Staffordshire.

With the exception of a loss of 24 acres (with a census population of 224) to the County Borough of Wolverhampton in 1933, the Urban District remained intact until 1966, when due to the provisions of the Local Government Act 1958, most of the Wednesfield Urban District was merged into Wolverhampton County Borough, though some parts were incorporated into Walsall County Borough and others into Cannock Rural District, now part of South Staffordshire district.

In the early 1950s, when Wednesfield was still independent from its larger neighbour, Wolverhampton council developed two overspill estates – Ashmore Park and Long Knowle – in Wednesfield to rehouse families from slums in the town.

For electoral purposes, Wednesfield is represented by the wards of Wednesfield North, Wednesfield South and Fallings Park, which together make up the Wednesfield and Fallings Park LANA (Local Area and Neighbourhood Arrangements).

It is part of the Wolverhampton North East constituency and is represented in the House of Commons by Jane Stevenson (a member of the Conservative Party) following her election on 12 December 2019.

History
On 5 August 910 the allied forces of Mercia and Wessex defeated an army of Northumbrian Vikings in the Battle of Tettenhall (sometimes called the Battle of Wednesfield or Wōdnesfeld).

Wednesfield was formerly well known for making all kinds of traps, from mousetraps, to mantraps and locks. Many of the factories that dominated the area have been cleared to make way for houses and other buildings.

Religion
The Church of St Thomas is located in the town centre.  It was originally consecrated in August 1750, as a chapel of ease of St. Peter's Collegiate Church, Wolverhampton and known as the Chapel of St. Thomas in Wednesfield.  It became a separate parish in 1849. It was almost completely destroyed by fire on 18 January 1902, as a result of which the tower is the only remaining part of the original building. The church was reconstructed in similar style to the original and continues in active use as a place of worship.

The Guru Nanak Gurdwara was opened in 1984 and is also located in the town centre, and caters for the local Sikh community, many of whom are descendants of those who immigrated to the area in the 1950s and onwards. A part of the Gurdwara suffered fire damage in 2002 so the committee decided to demolish the original building and the rebuild was ready by 2004. It has lifts for the elderly.

Economy

Wednesfield Village or 'the village' as it is still referred to by many residents) provides a range of shopping, office and community facilities for residents in the north east of Wolverhampton and some adjoining parts of the Metropolitan Borough of Walsall, along with services for the major industrial areas to the south of the town and New Cross Hospital.  Just to the west of the town centre, there is a large Sainsbury's supermarket and the Bentley Bridge Retail Park.  There is also a retail market.

Bentley Bridge consistes of both leisure and retail components. The leisure component is in the form of a multiplex cinema and bowling alley together with fast food outlets, a pub, numerous restaurants, whilst there is 14,700m² of retail space which includes a fitness gym.

The proximity to Wolverhampton city centre has been a major constraint on retail economic growth within the town. Wednesfield is part of a network of lower order Black Country town centres, providing principally convenience shopping facilities for a local catchment area and it is surrounded by centres with a similar role including Bilston to the south, Willenhall to the south east and Bloxwich to the east.

However, since 2009 the Bentley Bridge Retail Park has thrived with empty units being filled by national retailers. In September 2011 retailer TK Maxx announced plans to close its city centre store in Wolverhampton and relocate to Bentley Bridge. Whilst the retail park thrives, local independent traders on the high street continue to suffer due to economic circumstances.

The area to the south of the former railway line is characterised by industrial development, mostly with small units although there is some larger development such a steel processing and distribution plant.  Historically, the main industries were coal mining and trap making, although mining ceased in the area in the early twentieth century.

Transport
The Wyrley and Essington Canal running through the town was opened in 1797.  It was constructed to allow coal traffic to travel between mines near Great Wyrley and Wolverhampton, and was constructed following the contours of the land. This meant that the centre of the town was surrounded on three sides by the canal, and that almost all of the pre-existing roads required hump-backed bridges, and despite the improvement in communications and the potential for transporting goods via the canal, it is recorded that some local residents felt that it actually obstructed the development of the town, rather than assisting it. A second canal through the town, the Bentley Canal, opened in 1843 between Wednesfield Junction, near the modern New Cross Hospital, and Walsall.  The canal was abandoned in the 1960s, and only a short section at Wednesfield Junction is extant.

Wednesfield railway station on the Wolverhampton and Walsall Railway was opened in 1872, connecting the town with Wolverhampton High Level and Walsall.  It was operated by the Midland Railway, and was located on Neachells Lane to the south of the town centre. It closed to passenger traffic in 1931, although it remained open for goods traffic until the 1980s. Much of the trackbed was reused for the A4124 Wednesfield Way, which bypasses the town centre and opened in 1999.

The first railway within the township was the Grand Junction Railway, where Wednesfield Heath railway station (opened in 1837) was the primary station for Wolverhampton, and was located on Station Road, Heath Town.  The station was replaced by Wolverhampton High Level in the city centre, and closed to passengers in 1873 whilst remaining open for goods traffic until 1965. The siting of this station at Heath Town has been cited as a reason for the separation of Wednesfield and Heath Town.

Public transport in Wednesfield is coordinated by Transport for West Midlands. Most bus services within the town are operated by National Express West Midlands, with services from the town centre to destinations including Wolverhampton city centre, Bilston, Bloxwich, Walsall and Willenhall. The 59 bus route which runs from Wolverhampton city centre to Ashmore Park via New Cross Hospital and Wednesfield High Street is the most frequent in the city. The 71 bus route by Chaserider provides an hourly link to Essington, Great Wyrley and Cannock. Diamond West Midlands (Let's Go from 25th April 2022) 65 provides an hourly service between Wolverhampton and Fordhouses via New Cross Hospital and Bushbury Crematorium.  National Express West Midlands service 9 (from 29 August 2021) operates between Walsall, Pelsall, Bloxwich and Wolverhampton on a regular basis.

An extension of the West Midlands Metro through Wednesfield is planned, on the "5Ws" route from Wolverhampton to Wednesbury via Willenhall and Walsall.

Notable people

 Tom Aspaul – Singer, songwriter and producer
 Ruth Badger – Businesswoman and runner-up on the second series of The Apprentice
 Martin Cooper – England rugby union player
 John Cosnett – Darts player
 Wayne Jones – Darts player
 Jonathan Pedley − Master of Wine
 Hayley Price – Olympic gymnast
 Roy Rickhuss − Trade union leader
 Kevin Rowland – Musician and frontman of Dexys Midnight Runners
 Dion Sanderson – Footballer for Cardiff City
 Tessa Sanderson – Athlete and Olympic gold medallist
 Kristian Thomas – Olympic gymnast
 Mary Whitehouse – TV/radio clean-up campaigner, was a teacher at Lichfield Road School in the town in 1932–40.

References

External links
WV11.co.uk – A local community news and events resource
Wednesfield Site
 St Thomas' Church Wednesfield website
GENUKI Wednesfield History
Wednesfield Community Centre

Areas of Wolverhampton
Conservation areas in England